The 2010 Vodacom Cup was contested from 26 February to 7 May. The 2010 Vodacom Cup is the 13th edition of this annual domestic cup competition.

Teams

The following teams took part in the 2010 Vodacom Cup competition:

Northern Section

Southern Section

Tables

Northern Section

Southern Section

Results

Northern Section

Round 1

Round 2

Round 3

Round 4

Round 5

Round 6

Round 7

Southern Section

Round 1

Round 2

Round 3

Round 4

Round 5

Round 6

Round 7

Quarter-finals

Semi-finals

Final

References
2010 Vodacom Cup Fixtures

Vodacom Cup
2010 in South African rugby union
2010 rugby union tournaments for clubs
2010 in Argentine rugby union
2010 in Namibian sport